Peeter Kard (born Peeter Šmakov; 2 July 1940 in Tallinn – 4 April 2006 in Pärnu) was an Estonian actor and theatre director.

In 1962 he graduated from Tallinnfilm's educational studio. Since 1963 he worked at Endla Theatre.

Filmography

 1959: Vallatud kurvid
 1965: Me olime 18-aastased
 1966: Kirjad Sõgedate külast
 1968: Inimesed sõdurisinelis 
 1971: Tuuline rand
 1976: Aeg elada, aeg armastada
 1981: Pihlakaväravad 
 1994: Jüri Rumm 
 1995: Wikmani poisid 
 1997: Minu Leninid

References

1940 births
2006 deaths
Estonian male stage actors
Estonian male film actors
Estonian male television actors
Estonian male radio actors
20th-century Estonian male actors
Male actors from Tallinn